The Democratic Labour Party (DLP), colloquially known as the "Dems", is a political party in Barbados, established in 1955. It was the ruling party from 15 January 2008 to 24 May 2018 but faced an electoral wipeout in the 2018 general election which left it with no MPs.

In common with Barbados' other major party, the Barbados Labour Party, the DLP has been broadly described as centre-left social-democratic party, with local politics being largely personality-driven and responsive to contemporary issues and the state of the economy. Historically, the BLP claims a heritage from British liberalism, while the DLP was founded 11 years afterwards as a more left-leaning breakaway group.

History
The DLP was founded in 1955 by Errol Barrow, James Cameron Tudor, Frederick "Sleepy" Smith and 26 others. Once members of the Barbados Labour Party (BLP), these 29 broke away to form this more left-leaning alternative. However, as a result of their common origin, the two parties have been and remain ideologically similar. In the 1956 general election the DLP received 19.9% of the vote and won four seats. In the following election in 1961 it received fewer votes than the BLP, but won a majority of the seats in Parliament, with Barrow becoming Premier.

After the party retained power in the 1966 election (this time with a plurality of the vote), Barrow became the country's first Prime Minister. The party won a third successive election in 1971, but lost power to the BLP in 1976. It remained in opposition until victory in the 1986 election, in which it won 24 of the 27 seats. The DLP remained in power following the 1991 election, but was defeated by the BLP in 1994. It returned to power again in the 2008 election, when DLP leader David Thompson became Prime Minister. Following his death in 2010, Freundel Stuart succeeded to the office, and led the party to a narrow election victory in 2013.

The 2018 election saw the DLP lose all of its MPs. Stuart stepped down as leader, and Verla De Peiza, unopposed in a leadership election held by the party on 1 August 2018, became his successor in the role of DLP leader and president.

After losing the 2022 election which resulted in the DLP not regaining any seats in the  House of Assembly, De Peiza resigned on 21 January 2022. Ronnie Yearwood was then later elected DLP president after DLP elections took place on 1 May 2022.

Electoral history

House of Assembly elections

West Indies election

References

External links

Labour parties
Political parties established in 1955
Political parties in Barbados
Social democratic parties in North America
Republicanism in Barbados
1955 establishments in Barbados